Skin is a 2018 American short drama film, directed by Israeli-born filmmaker Guy Nattiv. Co written with Sharon Maymon, the film won the Academy Award for Best Live Action Short Film at the 91st Academy Awards, marking distributor Fox Searchlight Pictures' first win in the category.

Nattiv's full-length feature Skin, also released in 2018, is not related to this film in terms of their narratives.

Plot
A white family goes to a lake with friends. Their tattoos imply the group are Neo-Nazis. Jeffrey (Jonathan Tucker) brags that his son, Troy (Jackson Robert Scott) can shoot a target with a rifle and takes bets on the challenge. Troy successfully shoots the target.

The group heads to a grocery store, where Christa (Danielle Macdonald) shops for food. In the checkout line, Troy sees an African-American man, Jaydee (Ashley Thomas), holding a toy. Troy and the man smile at each other. As Jaydee is checking out, Jeffrey notices the interaction and accuses Jaydee of messing with his boy. Jaydee denies it and Jeffrey calls him a racial slur. Jaydee leaves, telling Jeffrey that he is the problem.

Jeffrey tells his friends about the dispute and they follow Jaydee into the parking lot. Jeffrey and his friends beat Jaydee viciously while Jaydee's wife calls the police from her car nearby. Troy watches the incident from the store as Christa frets. As the group leaves, Jaydee's wife holds him in the parking lot. Troy looks out the car window and makes eye contact with Jaydee's son, Bronny (Lonnie Chavis), who is nearly the same age.

The next evening, Jeffrey and Troy are driving home and find a van blocking the road. Jeffrey walks up to the van and a group of black men abduct him. Jeffrey is taken to the garage of a home, where several black men and Bronny drug and tattoo him over several days. Jaydee is there recovering.

Some time later, Jeffrey is thrown naked onto the same road he was abducted from. He sees his reflection in a window and finds his skin tattooed completely black. Inside their home, Christa wakes up to the sound of someone outside. She loads a handgun and calls for help. Jeffrey attempts to wash his skin clean with water but fails. Christa orders Troy to hide under the bed and not come out.

Jeffrey forcefully enters the home. Christa, seeing what appears to be a naked, black man in her home, warns him to get out or she will shoot him. Jeffrey manages to communicate to Christa who he is, and she drops her weapon. A shot rings out, and Jeffrey collapses. Troy stands in the doorway behind Jeffrey holding a rifle.

Cast

References

External links
 
 

2018 films
2018 drama films
2018 short films
Films about racism
Live Action Short Film Academy Award winners
Fox Searchlight Pictures films
American drama short films
2010s English-language films
2010s American films